The President's Barber is a 2004 South Korean comedy drama film directed by Im Chan-sang. It follows a barber, his wife, and their only son through four decades of tumultuous Korean history. Much as in Forrest Gump, we see important moments in South Korean history through the eyes of the titular barber, who is drafted to be the official barber of President Park Chung-hee. The role of the barber is played by Song Kang-ho and Moon So-ri plays his wife.

Story
Seong Han-mo (Song Kang-ho) is a barber and owns a shop in the president's neighborhood, the Blue House. Politically not very well-versed he always joins his acquaintances' opinions and at first also isn't aware what consequences result from president Rhee's resignation in 1960 after several student demonstrations. Rhee leaves a power vacuum that is soon filled by a military regime led by General Park Chung-hee (Jo Yeong-jin) who puts himself at the top of the government in 1963. Han-mo, however, has different concerns as his wife Min-ja (Moon So-ri) brings a son into this world of politically turbulent times. Fortunately, Han-mo's barber shop is running well and he has no need to concern himself about how to feed his family anymore when KCIA-Chef Jang (Son Byong-ho) enters his shop and orders him to the president. From that day on simple-minded Han-mo is the president's barber and at least for his neighbors one of the most important people in the country.

References
http://asianmovieweb.com/en/reviews/the_presidents_barber.htm

External links

2004 films
2000s Korean-language films
Showbox films
South Korean comedy-drama films
Films about coups d'état
2000s South Korean films